Walter Faxon (February 4, 1848 – August 10, 1920) was an American ornithologist and carcinologist. He was born at Jamaica Plain, Massachusetts, where he grew up. He received three degrees from Harvard University. One of his greater ornithological achievements was demonstration that Brewster's warbler is a hybrid.

He spent many years researching and classifying many American crayfish, including the genera Astacus, Orconectes, and Procambarus, and contributed to at least 20 different scientific papers. Following a 2017 review, carried out by Oxford University, the former Faxonius subgenus of Orconectes was raised to a full genus as the subgenera were not monophyletic. The genus Faxonella is similarly named to honour Faxon.

References

American carcinologists
American ornithologists
1848 births
1920 deaths
Harvard University alumni
People from Jamaica Plain
Scientists from Boston
19th-century American zoologists
20th-century American zoologists